All That Glitters Is a Mares Nest (also known simply as Maresnest) is a live album and concert film by the English rock band Cardiacs. It is their third live album, and was originally recorded in the afternoon in the Salisbury Arts Centre on 30 June 1990 with Napalm Death. It is the only Cardiacs album to feature guitarist Christian Hayes throughout. The album was released on VHS in 1992 and as a live album on 1 June 1995.

Napalm Death were recording their video Live Corruption (1992) at the same venue that evening, and seeing as both Cardiacs and Napalm Death shared the same manager, it was decided they could record two live videos in the same place for the price of one-and-a-half. The CD features two extra tracks ("Two Bites of Cherry" and "All Spectacular") that didn't appear on the video.

All That Glitters Is a Mares Nest is the only Cardiacs album to feature the band as a septet. The lineup of Cardiacs which played this concert did not entirely reflect the live touring band of the time as Sarah Smith had left the band the previous year, but continued to tour with them until 2007. The show was Tim Quy's last performance with Cardiacs.

Video 

The video was directed by Steve Payne and produced by Steven Malitsky, for Fotodisk.

Maresnest was officially re-released on DVD format on 2 September 2013, with improved video and sound quality.

The last track of the Sea Nymphs' second album On the Dry Land (2016), "Wanky", first appeared in the 'on the tour bus' section of the film.

The film was screened at the Barnes Film Festival on 20 June 2021, followed by an interview with keyboardist William D. Drake hosted by author and journalist Cathi Unsworth.

Track listing 
All songs written by Tim Smith unless otherwise indicated.

VHS (1992 release / 2013 DVD release)
"The Duck and Roger the Horse"
"There's Too Many Irons in the Fire"
"It's a Lovely Day" (Smith, Sarah Smith, Colvin Mayers, Mark Cawthra)
"Everything Is Easy"
"I Hold My Love in My Arms" (Smith, William D. Drake)
"Arnald"
"Baby Heart Dirt"
"To Go Off and Things" (Smith, Cawthra)
"The Leader of the Starry Skys"
"Tarred and Feathered" (Smith, Drake)
"Fast Robert"
"Big Ship"
"Visiting"
"R.E.S."
"Is This the Life?"

Personnel
Adapted from the Maresnest liner notes.

Cardiacs
Tim Quy – percussion
Tim Smith – lead guitar, vocals
Jim Smith – bass guitar, vocals
Sarah Smith – saxophone
Christian Hayes – guitar, vocals
William D. Drake – keyboards, vocals
Dominic Luckman – drums

Technical
Mike Smith – executive producer
Steve Malitsky – film producer
Steve Payne – film director
Cardiacs – sleeve design

References

Cardiacs live albums
Cardiacs video albums
1995 live albums